Hlusk is an urban-type settlement in the Hlusk District in the Mogilev Region of Belarus. It serves as the administrative center of the Hlusk District, and is home to nearly half of its district's residents.

History 

The earliest written records of Hlusk date back to the 15th century. In March 1655, during the Russo-Polish War, the village was destroyed by the Cossacks, and thus released by the Polish-Lithuanian Commonwealth from paying taxes for the following ten years. There was an active Jewish community there, where Rabbi Avraham  Yitzchak Zimmerman and later Rabbi Baruch Ber Leibowitz served as rabbi (Rabbi Leibowitz later moved to Lithuania). During the Second Partition of Poland, Hlusk became part of the Russian Empire. It was occupied by the Germans on June 28, 1941, and remained under their control until June 27, 1944.

Gallery

References 

Populated places in Mogilev Region
Urban-type settlements in Belarus
Villages in Belarus